C.I.D. is a 1955 Indian Malayalam film made for Merryland Studio by director M. Krishnan Nair which stars Prem Nazir, Miss Kumari, Kottarakkara Sreedharan Nair and Kumari Thankam. It is generally considered as the first crime thriller movie in Malayalam.

The film was dubbed into Tamil with the same title and was released in the same year, 1955. K. Devanarayanan wrote the lyrics and dialogues.

Plot
C.I.D. Sudhakaran is assigned to investigate the murder of Mukunda Menon, a wealthy planter. He discovers who is behind the murder and in the end marries Menon's daughter Vasanthi.

Cast
 Prem Nazir as C.I.D. Sudhakaran
 Miss Kumari as Vasanthi
 Kottarakkara Sreedharan Nair as Vallabhan
 Kumari Thankam as Valsala
 S. P. Pillai as Pichu & Vava
 Soman as Rudrapalan
 T. S. Muthaiah as Pachan
 Adoor Pankajam as Panki
 Jose Prakash as Mukunda Menon
 Sreekantan Nair as Inspector
 Kuttan Pillai as Sivaraman

References

External links
 
 C.I.D. at the Malayalam Movie Database

1950s Malayalam-language films
Fictional portrayals of police departments in India
Films directed by M. Krishnan Nair
Indian black-and-white films
Films scored by Br Lakshmanan